William Gallagher may refer to:

 William Gallagher (baseball) (1874–1950), baseball player
 William Gallagher (civil servant) (1851–1933), British civil servant
 William Gallagher (politician) (1875–1946), U.S. Representative from Minnesota
 William Gallagher (writer), British writer and journalist
 William Davis Gallagher (1808–1894), American journalist and poet
 William J. Gallagher (colonel), president of Riverside Military Academy in Gainesville, Georgia
 William M. Gallagher (1923–1975), Pulitzer Prize-winning photographer
 Bill Gallagher (baseball) (1863–1890), US baseball player
 Bill Gallagher (inventor) (Alfred William Gallagher, 1911–1990), New Zealand businessman and inventor
 Billy Gallagher (chef) (born 1948), chef and businessman in South Africa
 Billy Gallagher (footballer) (1885–1959), Australian rules footballer
 Billy Zero (William Gallagher, born 1971), radio and TV host
 Liam Gallagher (William John Paul Gallagher, born 1972), Oasis singer
 Rory Gallagher (William Rory Gallagher, 1948–1995), Irish blues-rock multi-instrumentalist, songwriter, and bandleader

See also
 William Gallacher (disambiguation)